The Suzuki Celerio is a hatchback city car produced by the Japanese manufacturer Suzuki since 2008. Originally a rebadged Alto/A-Star city car for some markets, the Celerio was made as a global nameplate and a standalone model replacing the A-Star in 2014. Suzuki unveiled the second-generation Celerio at the Auto Expo 2014 in India, after being previewed as the A:Wind concept model at the Thailand International Motor Expo in November 2013. The third-generation model was unveiled in November 2021. In 2023, the third-generation model was also marketed by Toyota in African markets as the Toyota Vitz.



First generation (2008) 

Prior to being developed as a standalone model from the second generation onwards, the "Celerio" nameplate was first used for the rebadged Alto/A-Star in some markets between 2008 and 2013.

Second generation (FE; 2014) 

The second-generation Celerio was launched in India as a standalone model with six variants. The diesel version of Celerio was introduced in the second quarter of 2015. The hatchback is currently available in petrol and CNG fuel options. The Celerio X is a premium variant of Celerio with a sportier look, equipped with AGS technology, Striking X graphic and grille design.

The petrol engine is a Suzuki K-series K10B latest revision called K-Next (not same as Wagon R K10B, because Wagon R has compression ratio of 10:1 while Celerio/Cultus has 11:1). The gearbox is basically a manual transmission with a transmission control unit (TCU) that actuates the hydraulics to shift the gears.

It was launched on the European market in the second half of 2014, having its European premiere at the Geneva Motor Show in March 2014. However, the British, Irish, Australian and New Zealand market (ceased being built for UK/IE market in 2019, 2021 for Australasia) were produced in the Suzuki's Rayong manufacturing plant in Thailand. The Australasian market model lacked a fifth seatbelt.

The Pakistani version of the Celerio (Cultus in Pakistan) was launched approximately a year after Previous Generation of Cultus was discontinued due to low sales. Pak Suzuki launched Cultus in three variants: VXR, VXL and VXL AGS. VXR and VXL had major differences, VXR did not come installed with Airbags, Fog lights, Alloy wheels, Immobilizer, Chrome grille, Body Colored door handles and Wing mirrors, while VXL was offered with these features. later in 2020, Sat-Nav was also available on VXL models. VXL AGS was basically the Automatic version of the VXL variant. 1.0 litre engine was the only option offered.

Pakistani version of Celerio was launched under Cultus nameplate. It was offered under Celerio name by Maruti Suzuki in India and Suzuki Motor Thailand in Rayong Province Thailand. It replaces the A-Star and Zen Estilo. The Celerio was Pakistan's first car with AutoGear Shift technology.

Safety
The India version of the Celerio was awarded zero stars by the Global NCAP after a test conducted in May 2016 (similar to Latin NCAP 2013). The basic version of the Celerio in India and Pakistan does not include airbags nor ABS and the body shell of the vehicle was rated by the Global NCAP as "unstable".

Latin NCAP awarded the Indian-made Latin American version with 2 airbags 4 stars in 2013.

The European Suzuki Celerio scored 3 of 5 stars when tested by Euro NCAP in 2014 (similar to Latin NCAP 2020) and 4 of 5 by ANCAP in 2015.  ANCAP and Euro NCAP received criticism claiming they underscored the Celerio relative to other cars that had fewer airbags or performed worse in crash tests.

Diesel
Maruti Suzuki introduced its all new 793 cc diesel engine in the Celerio on 3 June 2015, at a price of INR 4.65 lacs. The Celerio DDiS125 is powered by Suzuki’s first indigenously developed two-cylinder motor which delivers  of max power and 125 Nm of peak torque.

Externally, the Celerio diesel is identical to its petrol version. The Celerio diesel variant was discontinued in February 2017.

Third generation (2021) 

The third-generation Celerio was unveiled in India on 10 November 2021. The car is built on lightweight HEARTECT platform that also underpins Wagon R and Ignis. It is powered with a 1.0-liter K10C Dualjet engine which is a reworked K10B engine with dual fuel injectors per cylinder (Dual VVT) and several other modifications.

In January 2023, the third-generation Celerio was introduced in South Africa under the Toyota brand as the Toyota Vitz. Reusing the nameplate from the older Japanese market Yaris, the Vitz replaced the Agya as Toyota's entry level, A-segment car in the country.

Sales

References

External links
 

Celerio
Celerio
Cars introduced in 2008
2010s cars
2020s cars
City cars
Hatchbacks
Front-wheel-drive vehicles
Vehicles with CVT transmission
ANCAP superminis
Euro NCAP superminis
Global NCAP superminis
Latin NCAP superminis